Sreenath (26 August 1956 – 23 April 2010) was an Indian film and television actor. He has acted in many Malayalam films, including Shalini Ente Koottukari, Ithu Njangalude Katha, Oru CBI Diary Kurippu, and Kireedam.

Sreenath was a Shiv Sena candidate from the Attingal Lok Sabha constituency in the 2009 Lok Sabha elections.

Personal life

At the start of his film career, he worked with actress Shanthi Krishna in a few hit movies and fell in love during the shoot of Ithu Njangalude Katha. He later married her at Guruvayoor Temple in September 1984. They parted ways in September 1995.

He married Latha in 1999. The couple have a son named Viswajith.

Career
Sreenath began his film career in the 1980s, but slowly shifted his focus to television acting although he continued to act in films occasionally. He completed two years of acting courses at South India Film Chambers.

His popular films include Shalini Ente Koottukari, Ithu Njangalude Katha, Oru CBI Diary Kurippu, Kireedam, and Devaasuram. Sreenath's last film was 2009's Kerala Cafe, a movie that had 10 short films woven around a common theme.

Sreenath was winner of the state award for best TV actor twice.

Death
Sreenath was found dead with his wrists slashed in a hotel room in Kothamangalam in Kerala on 23 April 2010. He had been in Kothamangalam for the shooting of the Malayalam film Shikar. His body was later shifted to Thiruvananthapuram and cremated at Shanthikavadam Crematorium with full state honour.His death suspected as murder by his family. Mystery about his death remains to this day.

Awards
Kerala State Television Awards Best Actor 2000

Filmography

Malayalam

 Kerala Cafe (2009) as (segment "Makal")
 The Trigger (2007)
 Bhagavan (2007)
 Sketch (2007)
 Sethurama Iyer CBI (2004) as Sunny
 Vasanthamallika (2003) as Balakrishnan's father
 Meghamalhar (2001) as Bhoominathan
 Varnnakazhchakal (2000)
 Agni Sakshi (1999)
 Vazhunnor (1999) as Simon
 Kaalapani (1996) as Satyasheelan, a prisoner
 Thooval Kottaram (1996) as Mathew
 Manthrikam (1995) as Kernel
 Saadaram (1995) as Ravichandra Menon
 Bali (1995)
  Achankombathu Amma Varambathu (1990)
 Devaasuram (1993) as C. S.
 Chenkol (1993) as Keshu
 Sabarimalayil Thanka Sooriyodayam (1993)
 Ottayadippathakal (1993)
 Malootty (1992) as Raghavan
 Apaaratha (1992)
 Mathilukal (1990)
 Nale Ennundenkil (1990)
 Enquiry (1990)
 Adikkurippu (1989) as Raju
 Kireedam (1989) as Keshu
 News (1989) as Jeevan
 V. I. P. (1989) as Rajendran
 Aazhikkoru Muthu (1989) as Chandran
 Douthyam (1989) as Shekhar
 Innale (1989) as Gafoor
 Swagatham (1989)
 August 1 (1988) as Gopi
 Vicharana (1988) as Raghuvaran
 Innaleyude Bakki (1988)
 Oru CBI Diary Kurippu (1988) as Sunny
 Kudumba Puranam (1988) as Sivan
 Marikkunnila Njan (1988)
 Moonnam Mura (1988) as Raju
 Ezhuthapurangal (1987) as Sreenivasan
 Kaiyethum Doorathu (1987) as Murali
 Irupatham Noottandu (1987) as Jeevan
 Thoovanathumbikal (1987) as Madhavan
 Jaalakam (1987) as Anchal Sasi
 Sarvakalashala (1987) as Jeevan
 Vrutham (1987) as James Chacko
 Amme Bhagavathi (1987)
 Nirabedhangal (1987) as Balan
 Archanapookkal (1987)
 Vivahithare Ithile (1986)
 Bhagavan (1986)
 Hello My Dear Wrong Number (1986)
 Oru Yugasandhya (1986) as Karunan
 Koodum Thedi (1985) as Jayakumar
 Ayanam (1985) as Joy
 Oru Nokku Kanan (1985) 
 Arodum Parayaruthu (1985)
 Snehicha Kuttathinu (1985)
 Parayanumvayya Parayathirikkanumvayya (1985) ar Police Officer
 Swapnalokam (1984)
 Odaruthammava Aalariyam (1984)
 Muthodu Muthu (1984) as Gopi
 Itha Innu Muthal (1984) as Gopi/Jimmy Fernandez
 Piriyilla Naam (1984) as Gopi
 Sandhya Mayangum Neram (1984) as Mohan
 Mangalam Nerunnu (1984)
 Thacholi Thankappan (1984) as Basheer
 NH 47 (1984)
 Sagaram Santham (1983) as Madan Mohan
 Belt Mathai (1983) as Tony
 Professor Janaki (1983)
 Kinginikombu (1983)
 Eenam (1983)
 Visa (1983) as Balan
 Swapnalokam (1983)
 Chilanthivala (1982) as Suresh
 Ithu Njangalude Katha (1982) as Raghu
 Pooviriyum Pulari (1982) as Raghu
 Oothikachiya Ponnu (1981) as Dr. Samuel
 Thalam Manassinte Thalam (1981)
 Attimari (1981) as Babu
 Arayannam (1981) as Vijayan
 Kalika (1980) as Kariya
 Sathyam (1980) as Ramakrishna Nair
 Manasa Vacha Karmana (1979) as Rameshan's friend
 Shalini Ente Koottukari (1975) as Unnikrishnan

Tamil
 Rail Payanangalil  (1981)
 Chinnamul Periamul (1981)
 Kal Vadiyum Pookkal (1983)
 Poovizhi Vasalile  (1987)

Television serials

Malayalam
Samayam (Asianet)
Ragamritham (DD Malayalam)
Snehadooram (Asianet)
Sthree Janmam (Surya Tv)
Kadamathath Kathanaar (Asianet)
Kanakkuyil (Asianet)
Suryaputhri (Asianet)
Ente Suryaputhri (Surya Tv)
Ente manasaputhi (Asianet)
Hello Kuttichathan (Asianet)
Paarijatham (Asianet)
Akkare Ikkare (Asianet)
Nirmalyam (Asianet)
Police (ACV)
Mattoruval (Surya Tv)

Tamil
Ammavukku Kalyanam (DD)
Maharani (TV series) (Vijay TV)

References

External links
 
 Sreenath at MSI

2010 deaths
1956 births
Male actors from Kerala
People from Thrissur district
Indian male film actors
Male actors in Malayalam cinema
Male actors in Tamil cinema
Indian male television actors
Male actors in Malayalam television
20th-century Indian male actors
21st-century Indian male actors
2010 suicides
Male actors from Thrissur
Suicides in India
Artists who committed suicide
Suicides by sharp instrument